Lancang Jingmai Airport  is an airport serving Lancang Lahu Autonomous County in Pu'er, Yunnan province, southwest China. The airport is located in Donghui Township (东回乡),  from the county seat of Lancang. Menglian and Ximeng counties are also nearby. The airport received approval from the State Council and the Central Military Commission of China in January 2013.  It is expected to cost 1.514 billion yuan to build. The airport opened on 26 May 2017.

Facilities
The airport has a 2,600-meter runway (class 4C), and four aircraft parking spots. It is designed to handle 250,000 passengers and 750 tons of cargo per year by 2020.

Airlines and destinations

See also
List of airports in China
List of the busiest airports in China

References

Airports in Yunnan
Airports established in 2017
Buildings and structures in Pu'er
2017 establishments in China
Transport in Pu'er
Lancang Lahu Autonomous County